Yedidia Shofet (also spelled Shophet, and often referred to as Hakham Yedidia; November 14, 1908 – June 24, 2005) was the former Chief Rabbi of Iran and the worldwide spiritual leader of Persian Jewry.

Early life
Yedidia Shofet was born on November 14, 1908 in Kashan, Iran. He came from a family with twelve generations of rabbis. He moved to Tehran shortly after World War II.

His family, who has a long lineage of rabbis, are Sephardic Jews from Kashan, Iran. He was fluent in several languages, including Persian, Kashi, Aramaic, and Hebrew.

Career

In Iran
Shofet served as the Chief Rabbi of Iran. He became a liaison and spokesperson for Iranian Jews before the Shah, government officials, and Islamic clerics. He was instrumental in persuading the Shah and other government officials in the early 1950s to allow Iraqi Jews, who had been forced to leave Iraq, to find temporary refuge in Iran before eventually immigrating to Israel.

Rabbinic Relationships
Shofet corresponded with rabbinic authorities of his day, such as Ovadia Hedaya and Ovadia Yosef.

Post Revolution
Following the Iranian Revolution of 1979 and the execution of Habib Elghanian, Shofet, along with thousands of other Iranian Jews, immigrated to Southern California. While no longer working as a liaison for Iranian Jews, he continued to serve as a symbolic religious figure, urging Iranian Jewish families to preserve their Jewish tradition. In the United States, Shofet, with his son and other community leaders, helped establish the Nessah Synagogue in Beverly Hills, California.

Personal life
Shofet was married to Rabbanit Heshmat Shofet. They had four sons--David Shofet, Mussa Shofet, Ebi Shophet, and Morad Shophet--and two daughters--Yafa Nazarzadeh and Naima Abrishami.

Death
Shofet died on June 24, 2005 in Los Angeles, California. He was ninety-six years old. He was buried at the Eden Memorial Park Cemetery in Mission Hills, California.

Gallery

References

1908 births
2005 deaths
People from Kashan
People from Beverly Hills, California
Chief rabbis of Iran
20th-century American rabbis
21st-century American rabbis
American people of Iranian-Jewish descent
Exiles of the Iranian Revolution in the United States